Filipino may refer to:

 Something from or related to the Philippines
 Filipino language, a standardized variety of Tagalog, the national language of the Philippines
 Filipinos, people who are citizens of the Philippines or of Filipino descent
 Filipinos (snack food), a brand cookies manufactured in Europe

See also 
 
 
 Filipinas (disambiguation)

Language and nationality disambiguation pages